Jerome Russell Waldie (February 15, 1925 – April 3, 2009) was an American politician, he served five terms in the United States House of Representatives from California from 1966 to 1975.

Early life
Born in Antioch, California on February 15, 1925, Waldie attended Antioch public schools. After three years in the Army during World War II, he graduated from the University of California, Berkeley in 1950 with a degree in political science, and earned a law degree from the university's Boalt Hall School of Law in 1953. He served in the United States Army from 1943 to 1946.

Political career
Waldie served as a Democratic member of the California State Assembly from January 5, 1959, to January 16, 1966, becoming Majority Leader in 1961. One of his last accomplishments in Sacramento was to carry the constitutional amendment, pushed by Speaker of the Assembly Jesse Unruh, to create a full-time legislature.

Tenure in Congress 
Waldie was then elected to the 89th Congress, by special election, to fill the vacancy caused by the death of United States Representative John F. Baldwin. He was re-elected four times, serving from June 7, 1966, to January 3, 1975.

As a Congressman, he was an early critic of U.S. involvement in the Vietnam War and also advocated health care reforms.

During the Watergate scandal, Waldie was a vocal critic of President Richard Nixon. Three days after Nixon fired Watergate Special Prosecutor Archibald Cox (in what became known as the "Saturday Night Massacre"), Waldie introduced a resolution calling for the impeachment of the President, one of the first members of the House Judiciary Committee to do so. He later voted to impeach Nixon in July 1974 during the impeachment process against Richard Nixon.

Waldie did not run for re-election to the Congress that year. Instead, he campaigned for the Democratic nomination for Governor of California in the June primary election but was defeated by then-Secretary of State Jerry Brown, who went on to win in November.

Post-Congressional life
As an ex-Congressman, Waldie served as a public advocate. He was chairman of the Federal Mine Safety and Health Review Commission from 1978 to 1979 and the executive director of the White House Conference on Aging (1980). He also served as a member of the California Agricultural Relations Board from 1981 to 1985.

Death
He eventually retired to Placerville, California, where he resided until his death in April 2009.

References

Bibliography
Jerome Waldie and Nestle Frobish. Fair Play For Frogs: The Waldie-Frobish Papers' (New York, 1977)
Jerome Waldie. Oral History Interview''. Bancroft Library, University of California, Berkeley, 1987

External links

Join California Jerome Waldie

1925 births
2009 deaths
Democratic Party members of the California State Assembly
Democratic Party members of the United States House of Representatives from California
People from Antioch, California
United States Army personnel of World War II
UC Berkeley School of Law alumni
20th-century American politicians
People from Placerville, California